Leucochloron foederale is a species of flowering plant in the family Fabaceae. It is found only in Brazil.

References

Mimosoids
Flora of Brazil
Vulnerable plants
Taxonomy articles created by Polbot
Taxa named by James Walter Grimes
Taxa named by Rupert Charles Barneby